Yitzhak Yamin (born 1938 – 21 March 2020) was an Iraqi-born Israeli painter and sculptor.

Biography
Yitzhak Yamin was born in Iraq. In 1951, he immigrated to Israel and lived with his parents and eleven brothers and sisters in a ma'abara transit camp near Jerusalem. At the age of sixteen, Yamin left home and dedicated himself
to art. In 1961 he graduated from the Bezalel Academy of Arts and Design in Jerusalem.

In the sixties Yamin won the Sharett Foundation scholarship for young artists,
and studied under the Viennese artist Ernst Fuchs.

Artistic style
Yamin's art utilizes a variety of painting techniques, such as sketch, watercolor painting, tempera paintings and oil on canvas.
Beside being a painter Yamin also practices in plastic art, creating sculptures made of bronze, wood, marble, iron and stone. Yamin painted portraits of many well-known figures such as Rabbi Ovadia Yosef, prime minister Menachem Begin, and Egyptian president Anwar Al Sadat. Yamin had many solo exhibitions and participated in group shows. His paintings and sculptures are displayed in many private collections, public collections and galleries in Israel and abroad.

The “Holy Jerusalem” carpet designed by him is part of the Recanati collection in the Discount Bank in Tel-Aviv. In 1980 he designed and built a statue in memory of the fight over the Castel Hill. At the beginning of the nineties, he was invited to design a memorandum room for the veterans of the patrol unit “Sayeret Haruv” in the Jordan Valley.

Yizhak Yamin taught art in elementary schools and high schools. In 1970 he opened
his own private school.

See also
Visual arts in Israel

References

External links
 Artist Facebook page  

1938 births
2020 deaths
20th-century Israeli sculptors
Iraqi emigrants to Israel
Iraqi Jews
Israeli male painters
Israeli people of Iraqi-Jewish descent
Israeli portrait painters
Jewish painters
Jewish sculptors
Modern painters
Modern sculptors
20th-century Israeli male artists